Columbine Peak is a 12,662-foot-elevation (3,859 meter) mountain summit located  west of the crest of the Sierra Nevada mountain range, in Fresno County of northern California, United States. It is situated between Palisade Basin and Dusy Basin in the Palisades area of northern Kings Canyon National Park. This mountain's name has been officially adopted by the United States Board on Geographic Names. The first ascent of the summit was made prior to 1925 by persons unknown.

Climate
According to the Köppen climate classification system, Columbine Peak is located in an alpine climate zone. Most weather fronts originate in the Pacific Ocean, and travel east toward the Sierra Nevada mountains. As fronts approach, they are forced upward by the peaks, causing them to drop their moisture in the form of rain or snowfall onto the range (orographic lift). Precipitation runoff from this mountain drains into tributaries of the Middle Fork Kings River.

Gallery

See also

 List of mountain peaks of California

References

External links
 Weather forecast: Columbine Peak
 Columbine Peak Rock Climbing: Mountainproject.com

Mountains of Fresno County, California
Mountains of Kings Canyon National Park
North American 3000 m summits
Mountains of Northern California
Sierra Nevada (United States)